The Barbary partridge (Alectoris barbara) is a gamebird in the pheasant family (Phasianidae) of the order Galliformes. It is native to North Africa.

Distribution
The Barbary partridge has its main native range in North Africa, and is also native to Gibraltar and the Canary Islands (Alectoris barbara ssp. koenigi). It has been introduced to continental Portugal and Madeira, though there are no recent records of this species on the latter islands. It is also present in Sardinia.

Description
The Barbary partridge is a rotund bird, with a grey-brown back, grey breast and buff belly. The face is light grey with a broad reddish-brown gorget. It has rufous-streaked white flanks and red legs. When disturbed, it prefers to run rather than fly, but if necessary it flies a short distance on rounded wings.

It is closely related to its western European equivalent, the red-legged partridge. It is similar to the red-legged partridge, but it has a different head and neck pattern. The song is a noisy .

Breeding
This 33–36 cm bird is a resident breeder in dry, open and often hilly country. It nests in a scantily lined ground scrape laying 10-16 eggs. A few cases of breeding in trees in empty nest of African Magpie Pica mauretanica have been documented in Tunisia, probably to escape strong predation on the ground.

The Barbary partridge takes a wide variety of seeds and some insect food. It usually starts feeding and drinking at dawn.

The Barbary partridge is the national bird of Gibraltar where it appears on the 1 pence local coins.

Gallery

References

Barbary partridge
Birds of North Africa
Barbary partridge
Barbary partridge